The Sordariaceae are a family of perithecial fungi within the Sordariales order.

The family includes the important model organism Neurospora crassa that is used in genetic research. Members of the family include the red bread molds in the genus Neurospora, including Neurospora sitophila, which is used to produce the fermented food oncom.  Other species in the family inhabit herbivore dung or plant parts.

Characteristics
Sordariaceae have dark, usually ostiolate ascomata, and unitunicate, cylindrical asci. Their ascospores are brown to black, often with a gelatinous sheath or with wall ornamentations, but lack gelatinous appendages.

Systematics
The family includes the following genera:
Cainiella
Copromyces
Effetia
Gelasinospora
Guilliermondia
Neurospora
Pseudoneurospora
Sordaria
Stellatospora
The Gelasinospora might be included in Neurospora.

References

Sordariales
Ascomycota families